Andhagan is an upcoming Indian Tamil-language black comedy crime thriller film co-written and directed by Thiagarajan. A remake of the 2018 Hindi film Andhadhun, it stars Prashanth, Karthik, Simran, Priya Anand and Samuthirakani. The film revolves around a blind pianist who unwittingly becomes embroiled in a murder.

Thiagarajan purchased the remake rights of Andhadhun in 2019, and in January 2020 Mohan Raja was announced as director. Raja left the project that October, and was replaced by JJ Fredrick who also left months later, with Thiagarajan taking over directing. The film began production in March 2021, delayed from an April 2020 start date due to the COVID-19 pandemic, and was completed by November 2022.

Premise 
A blind pianist unwittingly becomes embroiled in a murder.

Cast

Production

Development 
In August 2019, it was announced that Thiagarajan had purchased the rights to remake the Hindi film Andhadhun (2018) in Tamil, outbidding other producers like Dhanush and Siddharth. Thiagarajan said he had been in discussions with the production house of Andhadhun since that film's release, and due to the rapport that they developed, he was able to acquire the remake rights. The remake would be produced under the Staar Movies banner. The team held discussions with director Gautham Vasudev Menon in late August 2019 about directing the film, but he ultimately did not work on the project.

In January 2020, it was announced that Mohan Raja would direct the yet-untitled remake. However, that October, he withdrew from the project and was replaced by JJ Fredrick. Raja's withdrawal was reported to be due to scheduling conflicts with a Telugu film he had previously signed on to direct. The title Andhagan was unveiled on 1 January 2021. In March 2021, Fredrick announced his departure from the film without specifying a reason, and Thiagarajan took over directing. He also wrote the screenplay and Pattukkottai Prabakar wrote the dialogues. Thiagarajan claimed he took over direction to avoid production delays, and "every other remake version of the original was gearing up for release". Cinematographer Ravi Yadav agreed to Thiagarajan's request to set aside three months to work on the film. Editing was handled by Sathish Suriya.

Casting 
In August 2019, Thiagarajan announced that his son Prashanth would play the protagonist, a pianist. He noted that since Prashanth was a trained pianist, this benefited the casting. In April 2020, Thiagarajan said there had been discussions with Tabu to reprise her role as the retired actor's wife from Andhadhun, but the actress eventually did not sign on. Ramya Krishnan was also considered for the role, but did not join the project. That August, Thiagarajan said Yogi Babu would play the "crucial role" of an auto driver, and Karthik had also agreed to join the film. In response to reports that Karthik was cast as the retired actor originally played by Anil Dhawan, Thiagarajan said his role had not yet been decided; he expressed his interest in seeing Karthik in the role of the doctor originally played by Zakir Hussain, but Karthik was ultimately confirmed to be cast in Dhawan's role. The producers held discussions with Aishwarya Rai Bachchan to play the role earlier offered to Tabu during October 2020, but she did not sign the film. In December 2020, Simran was confirmed for that role.

In January 2021, K. S. Ravikumar was cast in an undisclosed role, later revealed to be the doctor. Thiagarajan said casting for the role originally played by Radhika Apte was underway, and the makers were searching for an "established actor" to play the role, though by the time filming began, the role was still not cast. On 18 March, it was announced that Priya Anand was cast in the role. She sought not to emulate Apte, but give the character her own unique interpretation. In the same month Vanitha Vijayakumar joined, playing the role originally played by Ashwini Kalsekar. Vanitha had not watched Andhadhun until after she was approached for the role, and chose to act on instinct without being influenced by Kalsekar's performance. Manav Vij was initially chosen to reprise his role from Andhadhun as the police inspector, but ultimately did not remain on the project because of delays in the beginning of production. In April 2021, Samuthirakani was approached to play the character; despite his busy schedule, he accepted the role. The film is the acting debut of Lakshmi Pradeep, a finalist of the fifth season of Star Vijay's Super Singer.

Filming 
Principal photography was supposed to begin in April 2020, but was delayed due to the COVID-19 pandemic. It was later rescheduled to begin in January 2021, but ultimately began on 10 March at Prashanth Gold Tower, Chennai, hours before Fredrick announced his exit. Thiagarajan planned to finish shooting within 35 days without any breaks in schedule. Shooting also took place in a house in T. Nagar which the crew bought and remodelled so it would resemble the house from Andhadhun.

The climax was initially planned to be filmed in London, but those plans were dropped by April due to the COVID-19 lockdown there. Filming was 50% complete by that time, with only small schedules in Chennai and Puducherry remaining, along with a three-day schedule in another European country. By 27 April, filming had been suspended indefinitely due to the second wave of the pandemic in India, with Thiagarajan saying it would resume once the entire crew was vaccinated against COVID-19. Filming ultimately resumed on 6 July at a hotel in Chennai, and the schedule there was completed on 28 July, with only the climax left to be filmed in an overseas country. Principal photography wrapped by mid-2022, with the exception of a song sequence choreographed by Prabhu Deva, which was filmed in mid-November that year.

Music 
The music has been composed by Santhosh Narayanan. Thiagarajan chose him as the composer after being impressed with his work in Cuckoo (2014). The audio rights were bought by Sony Music India. Thiagarajan said plans were to have the audio launch in March 2022. The first single, "En Kadhal", was released on 7 March. The second single, "Yosichi Yosichi", was released on 26 May. The third single "Kannile" was released on 23 February 2023. Another single, "Dorra Bujji", is awaiting release.

Release 
In early March 2022, Kalaipuli S. Thanu acquired the rights to distribute the film worldwide via his V Creations. The film, however, faced repeated delays in its release, and the makers seldom posted updates on the film, only releasing new posters on public holidays or festivals.

References

External links 
 

Film productions suspended due to the COVID-19 pandemic
Films about blind people in India
Films about pianos and pianists
Indian black comedy films
Indian crime thriller films
Tamil remakes of Hindi films
Upcoming Tamil-language films